Steatoda erigoniformis is a species of cobweb spider in the family Theridiidae. It is found in a range from the East Mediterranean to the Near East, Caucasus, China, Korea, Japan, and has been introduced into the Caribbean.

References

Further reading

External links

 

Steatoda
Articles created by Qbugbot
Spiders described in 1872